Elkhan Suleymanov (born 2 February 1974), also known as Elxan Süleymanov, is an Azerbaijani weightlifter. He competed in the men's featherweight event at the 2000 Summer Olympics.

References

External links
 

1974 births
Living people
Azerbaijani male weightlifters
Olympic weightlifters of Azerbaijan
Weightlifters at the 2000 Summer Olympics
Place of birth missing (living people)